Victor Franz Hess (24 June 188317 December 1964) was an Austrian-American physicist, and Nobel laureate in physics, who discovered cosmic rays.

Biography 
He was born to Vinzenz Hess and Serafine Edle von Grossbauer-Waldstätt, in Waldstein Castle, near Peggau in Styria, Austria, on 24 June 1883. His father was a royal forester in Prince Louis of Oettingen-Wallerstein's service. He attended secondary school at Graz Gymnasium from 1893 to 1901.

From 1901 to 1905, Hess was an undergraduate student at the University of Graz. In 1910, Hess received his PhD from the University of Vienna. He worked as Assistant under Stefan Meyer at the Institute for Radium Research, Viennese Academy of Sciences, from 1910 to 1920.

In 1920 he married Marie Bertha Warner Breisky.

Hess took a leave of absence in 1921 and travelled to the United States, working at the United States Radium Corporation, in New Jersey, and as Consulting Physicist for the US Bureau of Mines, in Washington, D.C. In 1923, he returned to the University of Graz, and was appointed the Ordinary Professor of Experimental Physics in 1925. The University of Innsbruck appointed him Professor, and Director Institute of Radiology, in 1931.

Hess relocated to the United States with his Jewish wife in 1938, in order to escape Nazi persecution. The same year Fordham University appointed him Professor of Physics, and he later became a naturalized United States citizen in 1944. His wife died of cancer in 1955. The same year he married Elizabeth M. Hoenke, the woman who nursed Berta at the end of her life.

He was a practicing Roman Catholic, and in 1946 he wrote on the topic of the relationship between science and religion in his article "My Faith", in which he explained why he believed in God. He retired from Fordham University in 1958 and he died on 17 December 1964, in Mount Vernon, New York from Parkinson's disease.

Cosmic rays 

Between 1911 and 1913, Hess undertook the work that won him the Nobel Prize in Physics in 1936. For many years, scientists had been puzzled by the levels of ionizing radiation measured in the atmosphere. The assumption at the time was that the radiation would decrease as the distance from the earth, the then assumed source of the radiation, increased. The electroscopes previously used gave an approximate measurement of the radiation, but indicated that at greater altitude in the atmosphere the level of radiation might actually be higher than that on the ground. Hess approached this mystery first by greatly increasing the precision of the measuring equipment, and then by personally taking the equipment aloft in a balloon. He systematically measured the radiation at altitudes up to  during 1911–1912. The daring flights were made both by day and during the night, at significant risk to himself.

His conclusion was that there was radiation penetrating the atmosphere from outer space, and his discovery was confirmed by Robert Andrews Millikan in 1925, who gave the radiation the name "cosmic rays". Hess's discovery opened the door to many new discoveries in particle and nuclear physics. In particular, both the positron and the muon were first discovered in cosmic rays by Carl David Anderson. Hess and Anderson shared the 1936 Nobel Prize in Physics.

Honours and awards 
 Lieben Prize (1919)
 Abbe Memorial Prize
 Abbe Medal of the Carl Zeiss Institute, Jena (1932)
 Nobel Prize in Physics (1936)
 Austrian Decoration for Science and Art (1959)
 A lunar crater is named after Hess

Publications

References

External links 

  Biography and Nobel lecture
 Victor Francis Hess – Not only the Discoverer of the Cosmic Radiation Diploma thesis (in German)

1883 births
1964 deaths
20th-century American physicists
People from Graz-Umgebung District
American Nobel laureates
Austrian emigrants to the United States
Austrian Nobel laureates
Austro-Hungarian Nobel laureates
Austrian Roman Catholics
Experimental physicists
Fordham University faculty
Nobel laureates in Physics
Recipients of the Austrian Decoration for Science and Art
Emigrants from Austria after the Anschluss
University of Graz alumni
Academic staff of the University of Graz
Academic staff of the University of Innsbruck
Cosmic ray physicists
Spectroscopists
20th-century Austrian physicists